The 2022–23 season is the 102nd season in the history of S.C. Braga and their 27th consecutive season in the top flight. The club are participating in Primeira Liga, Taça de Portugal, Taça da Liga, UEFA Europa League and UEFA Europa Conference League.

Players

Out on loan

Transfers

Pre-season and friendlies

Competitions

Overall record

Primeira Liga

League table

Results summary

Results by round

Matches 
The league fixtures were announced on 5 July 2022.

Taça de Portugal

Taça da Liga

Third round

Quarter-finals

UEFA Europa League

Group stage 

The draw for the group stage was held on 26 August 2022.

Knockout phase

Knockout round play-offs
The knockout round play-offs draw was held on 7 November 2022.

Statistics

Squad appearances and goals

|-
! colspan=18 style=background:#dcdcdc; text-align:center|Goalkeepers

|-
! colspan=18 style=background:#dcdcdc; text-align:center|Defenders

|-
! colspan=18 style=background:#dcdcdc; text-align:center|Midfielders

|-
! colspan=18 style=background:#dcdcdc; text-align:center|Forwards

|-
! colspan=18 style=background:#dcdcdc; text-align:center|Players who have made an appearance this season but have left the club

|}

References

S.C. Braga seasons
Braga
Braga